North Slope Borough School District (NSBSD) is a school district headquartered in Utqiaġvik, Alaska (formerly Barrow).

It serves all areas of the North Slope Borough.

Schools

K-12 schools:
 Alak School (Wainwright)
 Kali School (Point Lay)
 Harold Kaveolook School (Kaktovik)
 Meade River School (Atqasuk)
 Nuiqsut Trapper School (Nuiqsut)
 Nunamiut School (Anaktuvuk Pass)
 Tikiġaq School (Point Hope)

Schools in Utqiaġvik:
 Barrow High School
 Hopson Middle School
 Ipalook Elementary School
 Kiita Learning Community

References

External links
 

School districts in Alaska
Education in North Slope Borough, Alaska